Benjamin Choquert (born 17 April 1986) is a French long-distance runner and duathlete. He won the silver medal in the men's individual duathlon event at the 2022 World Games held in Birmingham, United States.

In 2018, he competed in the men's half marathon at the 2018 IAAF World Half Marathon Championships held in Valencia, Spain. He finished in 40th place.

In 2019, he won the men's event at the ITU Duathlon World Championships held in Pontevedra, Spain.

References

External links 
 

Living people
1986 births
Place of birth missing (living people)
French male long-distance runners
Duathletes
World Games silver medalists
Competitors at the 2022 World Games
20th-century French people
21st-century French people
Athletes (track and field) at the 2022 Mediterranean Games
Mediterranean Games silver medalists for France
Mediterranean Games medalists in athletics